Jerzy Jełowicki (11 August 1899 – 22 September 1939) was a Polish landowner, agricultural engineer, military reservist and painter. For his service as a military reservist, he was awarded the Order of Virtuti Militari. He obtained his degree in agronomy at the Warsaw University of Life Sciences, followed by studies at the Academy of Fine Arts in Warsaw.

His work was part of the painting event in the art competition at the 1936 Summer Olympics. He was killed three weeks into the German invasion of Poland in the Siege of Warsaw during World War II.

References

1899 births
1939 deaths
20th-century Polish painters
20th-century Polish male artists
Olympic competitors in art competitions
Polish military personnel killed in World War II
Polish male painters
Recipients of the Virtuti Militari